The Anglican Communion does not have a centralised canon law of its own, unlike the canon law of the Catholic Church.  Each of the autonomous member churches of the communion, however, does have a canonical system.  Some, such as the Church of England, has an ancient, highly developed canon law while others, such as the Episcopal Church in the United States have more recently developed canonical systems originally based on the English canon law.

Different canon laws

See also

 Anglicanism
 Ecclesiastical Law Society
 Religious law
 Valid but irregular

References

Sources

Further reading
 
 

 
Anglican theology and doctrine